The 2022 St. Louis Cardinals season was the 141st for the St. Louis Cardinals, a Major League Baseball (MLB) franchise in St. Louis, Missouri. It was the 131st season for the Cardinals in the National League (NL) and their 17th at Busch Stadium III. They were managed by first-year manager Oliver Marmol. The season saw the return of Albert Pujols, a former Cardinals star player. Pujols and longtime catcher Yadier Molina announced that the 2022 season would be their last. 

On December 2, 2021, Commissioner of Baseball Rob Manfred announced a lockout of players, following expiration of the collective bargaining agreement (CBA) between the league and the Major League Baseball Players Association (MLBPA). On March 10, 2022, the MLB and MLBPA agreed to a new collective bargaining agreement, thus ending the lockout. Opening Day was played on April 7. Although MLB previously announced that several series would be cancelled due to the lockout, the agreement provides for a 162-game season, with originally canceled games to be made up via doubleheaders.

The Cardinals won the National League Central division but they were upset in the Wild Card Series by the Philadelphia Phillies, losing in a two-game sweep.

Offseason

Coaching changes 
On October 14, 2021, the Cardinals fired manager Mike Shildt. On October 25, the team named Oliver Marmol the new manager.

Lockout 

The expiration of the league's collective bargaining agreement (CBA) with the Major League Baseball Players Association occurred on December 1, 2021, with no new agreement in place. As a result, the team owners voted unanimously to lock out the players, stopping all free agency and trades.

The parties came to an agreement on a new CBA on March 10, 2022.

Rule changes 
Under the new CBA, several new rules were instituted for the 2022 season. The National League will adopt the designated hitter full-time, a draft lottery will be implemented, the postseason will expand from ten teams to twelve, and advertising patches will appear on player uniforms and helmets for the first time.

Regular season

Summary

April
On April 27, Nolan Arenado was ejected for inciting a bench-clearing brawl against the New York Mets after yelling at Yoan López for throwing near his head, assuming the throw was retaliation for the Cardinals having hit three Mets batters the night before. Arenado received a two-game suspension for the incident, but the suspension was reduced to one game after an appeal.  He was named National League Player of the Month after having batted .375 with five home runs, 17 RBI, 12 extra-base hits and a league-leading 1.125 OPS.  The last Cardinals third baseman to win the award was Ken Reitz in May 1977.

May
On May 23, Goldschmidt hit a walk-off grand slam in the bottom of the tenth inning versus the Toronto Blue Jays for a 7–3 win.  That grand slam extended Goldschmidt's hitting streak to 15 games, during which he had batted .438 with 28 hits, 12 doubles, five home runs, and 22 RBI.  Since RBI became an official statistic in 1920, no major leaguer had previously achieved all of those totals during any 15-game span.

For the month of May, Goldschmidt led the major leagues with a 1.288 OPS and 33 RBI, alongside leading the National League with a .404 average.  His ten home runs ranked second in the NL.  Thus, he was named the NL Player of the Month.  It was the third consecutive month a Cardinal had been named a NL Player of the Month, following O'Neill (September 2021) and Arenado (April 2022).

June
Goldschmidt continued his hit streak for 25 games until June 4 versus the Chicago Cubs, when he was 0-for-2 with two bases on balls.  During the streak, he hit .424 (42-for-99)/.482/.869, 24 extra base hits and 36 RBI.  It was the longest hitting streak by a Cardinal since Pujols hit in 30 straight in 2003, and tied for third-longest for the Cardinals since 1963.  Albert Pujols became the 10th player in major league history to achieve 3,000 games played on June 4, appearing in the second inning as an injury replacement for Corey Dickerson.

On June 11, 2022, Tommy Edman hit a two-run home run in the bottom of the ninth inning versus the Cincinnati Reds for his first career walk-off home run and RBI, to secure a 5–4 victory.  For much of the game, the Reds led, 3–1, but the Cardinals scored four runs in the eighth and ninth innings to rally to win.

July
The Cardinals hit four consecutive home runs on July 2, 2022, the 11th such occurrence in major league history.  At Citizens Bank Park in Philadelphia, Nolan Arenado, Nolan Gorman, Juan Yepez and Dylan Carlson all homered off Phillies starter Kyle Gibson with two outs in the first inning.  It was the first time that the Cardinals had accomplished the feat, and the first time that it occurred in the first inning.  The last club to do so were the Chicago White Sox on August 16, 2020.  Arenado later won the game for St. Louis in the ninth inning with his second home run of the game, 7–6, which was also the 5,000th at bat of his career.

August 
In August, the Cardinals went 22-7, their best month of the season. They notched their season's first series sweep, of the New York Yankees. They overtook the Milwaukee Brewers in the race for the National League Central division; at one point, their lead stood at 8.5 games.

September 
In a September 8 game against the Washington Nationals, Adam Wainwright and Yadier Molina made their 324th start as a battery, tying the Major League record. On September 14, Wainwright and Molina made their record-breaking 325th start, in a game against the Milwaukee Brewers that the Cardinals won 4-1. On September 23, 2022, Albert Pujols hit his 699th and 700th home runs, in a game in which the Cardinals shut out the Los Angeles Dodgers, 11-0.

Season standings

National League Central

National League Wild Card

Game Log

 
|- style="background:#bfb;" 
| 1 || April 7 || Pirates || 9–0 || Wainwright (1–0) || Brubaker (0–1) || — || 46,256 || 1–0 || W1
|- style="background:#bfb;" 
| 2 || April 9 || Pirates || 6–2 || Whitley (1–0) || Keller (0–1) || — || 45,025 || 2–0 || W2
|- style="background:#fbb;"  
| 3 || April 10 || Pirates || 4–9 || Yajure (1–0) || Matz (0–1) || — || 40,027 || 2–1 || L1
|- style="background:#bfb;" 
| 4 || April 12 || Royals || 6–5 || Hicks (1–0) || Lynch (0–1) || Gallegos (1) || 40,398 || 3–1 || W1
|- style="background:#fbb;" 
| 5 || April 14 || @ Brewers || 1–5 || Woodruff (1–1) || Wainwright (1–1) || — || 42,794 || 3–2 || L1
|- style="background:#bfb;" 
| 6 || April 15 || @ Brewers || 10–1 || Mikolas (1–0) || Peralta (0–1) || — || 26,874 || 4–2 || W1
|- style="background:#bfb;" 
| 7 || April 16 || @ Brewers || 2–1 || Matz (1–1) || Houser (0–2) || Gallegos (2) || 26,356 || 5–2 || W2
|- style="background:#fbb;" 
| 8 || April 17 || @ Brewers || 5–6 || Cousins (1–0) || Hudson (0–1) || Hader (4) || 23,001 || 5–3 || L1
|- style="background:#bfb;" 
| 9 || April 19 || @ Marlins || 5–1 || Wainwright (2–1) || Luzardo (0–1) || — || 8,475 || 6–3 || W1
|- style="background:#bfb;" 
| 10 || April 20 || @ Marlins || 2–0 || Cabrera (1–0) || Bender (0–2) || Gallegos (3) || 8,655 || 7–3 || W2
|- style="background:#fbb;" 
| 11 || April 21 || @ Marlins || 0–5 || López (2–0) || Hicks (1–1) || — || 9,670 || 7–4 || L1
|- style="background:#bfb;" 
| 12 || April 22 || @ Reds || 4–2 || Matz (2–1) || Greene (1–2) || Gallegos (4) || 20,470 || 8–4 || W1
|- style="background:#bfb;" 
| 13 || April 23 || @ Reds || 5–0 || Hudson (1–1) || Mahle (1–2) || — || 28,598 || 9–4 || W2  
|- style="background:#fbb;”
| 14 || April 24 || @ Reds || 1–4 || Lodolo (1–2) || Wainwright (2–2) || Sims (1) || 23,124 || 9–5 || L1
|- style="background:#fbb;" 
| 15 || April 25 || Mets || 2–5 || May (1–0) || Gallegos (0–1) || Diaz (2) || 35,455 || 9–6 || L2
|- style="background:#fbb;" 
| 16 || April 26 || Mets || 0–3 || Bassitt (3–1) || Hicks (1–2) || Diaz (3) || 32,215 || 9–7 || L3
|- style="background:#bfb;" 
| 17 || April 27 || Mets || 10–5 || Woodford (1–0) || Carrasco (1–1) || — || 34,822 || 10–7 || W1
|- style="background:#bfb;" 
| 18 || April 28 || Diamondbacks || 8–3 || Hudson (2–1) || Castellanos (1–1) || — || 33,464 || 11–7 || W2
|- style="background:#fbb;" 
| 19 || April 29 || Diamondbacks || 2–6 || Bumgarner (1–1) || Wainwright (2–3) || — || 40,753 || 11–8 || L1
|- style="background:#fbb;" 
| 20 || April 30 || Diamondbacks || 0–2 || Kelly (2–1) || Mikolas (1–1) || Kennedy (1) || 40,144 || 11–9 || L2
|-

 
|- style="background:#bfb;" 
| 21 || May 1 || Diamondbacks || 7–5 || Whitley (2–0) || Middleton (0–1) || Helsley (1) || 45,123 || 12–9 || W1
|- style="background:#bfb;"  
| 22 || May 2 || Royals || 1–0 || Matz (3–1) || Greinke (0–2) || Gallegos (5) || 33,963 || 13–9 || W2
|- style="background:#fbb;" 
| 23 || May 3 || @ Royals || 1–7 || Keller (1–2) || Hudson (2–2) || — || 18,788 || 13–10 || L1
|- style="background:#bfb;" 
| 24 || May 4 || @ Royals || 10–0 || Wainwright (3–3) || Bubic (0–3) || — || 12,774 || 14–10 || W1
|- style="background:#bfb;" 
| 25 || May 5 || @ Giants || 7–1 || Mikolas (2–1) || Littell (0–1) || — || 22,562 || 15–10 || W2
|- style="background:#bfb;" 
| 26 || May 6 || @ Giants || 3–2 || Helsley (1–0) || Doval (0–1) || Gallegos (6) || 28,898 || 16–10 || W3
|- style="background:#fbb;" 
| 27 || May 7 || @ Giants || 7–13 || Webb (4–1) || Matz (3–2) || — || 40,113 || 16–11 || L1
|- style="background:#fbb;" 
| 28 || May 8 || @ Giants || 3–4 || Leone (2–0) || Cabrera (1–1) || Doval (5) || 38,193 || 16–12 || L2
|- style="background:#fbb;" 
| 29 || May 10 || Orioles || 3–5 || Bradish (1–1) || Naughton (0–1) || Bautista (1) || 33,649 || 16–13 || L3
|- style="background:#bfb;" 
| 30 || May 11 || Orioles || 10–1 || Mikolas (3–1) || Watkins (0–1) || — || 34,533 || 17–13 || W1
|- style="background:#fbb;" 
| 31 || May 12 || Orioles || 2–3 || Akin (1–0) || Matz (3–3) || Bautista (2) || 35,198 || 17–14 || L1
|- style="background:#fbb;" 
| 32 || May 13 || Giants || 2–8 || Webb (5–1) || Hicks (1–3) || — || 39,612 || 17–15 || L2
|- style="background:#bfb;" 
| 33 || May 14 || Giants || 4–0 || Hudson (3–2) || Junis (1–1) || — || 44,537 || 18–15 || W1
|- style="background:#bfb;" 
| 34 || May 15 || Giants || 15–6 || Wainwright (4–3) || Rodón (4–2) || — || 39,703 || 19–15 || W2
|- style="background:#fbb;" 
| 35 || May 17  || @ Mets || 1–3 || Reed (1–0) || Mikolas (3–2) || Díaz (9) ||  || 19–16 || L1
|- style="background:#bfb;" 
| 36 || May 17  || @ Mets || 4–3 || Helsley (2–0) || Rodríguez (0–2) || Gallegos (7) || 27,457 || 20–16 || W1
|- style="background:#fbb;" 
| 37 || May 18 || @ Mets || 4–11 || Scherzer (5–1) || Walsh (0–1) || — || 32,798 || 20–17 || L1
|- style="background:#fbb;" 
| 38 || May 19 || @ Mets || 6–7  || Holderman (1–0) || Gallegos (0–2) || — || 28,801 || 20–18 || L2
|- style="background:#bfb;" 
| 39 || May 20 || @ Pirates || 5–3 || Wainwright (5–3) || Thompson (2–4) || Gallegos (8) || 14,034 || 21–18 || W1
|- style="background:#bfb;" 
| 40 || May 21 || @ Pirates || 5–4 || VerHagen (1–0) || Quintana (1–2) || Helsley (2) || 24,644 || 22–18 || W2
|- style="background:#bfb;" 
| 41 || May 22 || @ Pirates || 18–4 || Rondón (1–0) || Wilson (0–3) || — || 13,510 || 23–18 || W3
|- style="background:#bfb;" 
| 42 || May 23 || Blue Jays || 7–3  || Cabrera (2–1) || Phelps (0–1) || — || 36,033 || 24–18 || W4
|- style="background:#fbb;" 
| 43 || May 24 || Blue Jays || 1–8 || Gausman (4–3) || Hicks (1–4) || — || 33,797 || 24–19 || L1
|- style="background:#fbb;" 
| 44 || May 26 || Brewers || 3–4 || Lauer (5–1) || Wainwright (5–4) || Hader (16) || 35,107 || 24–20 || L2
|- style="background:#bfb;" 
| 45 || May 27 || Brewers || 4–2 || VerHagen (2–0) || Woodruff (5–3) || Helsley (3) || 39,077 || 25–20 || W1
|- style="background:#bfb;" 
| 46 || May 28 || Brewers || 8–3 || Liberatore (1–0) || Houser (3–5) || — || 45,594 || 26–20 || W2
|- style="background:#fbb;" 
| 47 || May 29 || Brewers || 0–8 || Burnes (3–2) || Mikolas (3–3) || — || 44,169 || 26–21 || L1
|- style="background:#bfb;" 
| 48 || May 30 || Padres || 6–3 || Pallante (1–0) || Martinez (2–3) || — || 42,140 || 27–21 || W1
|- style="background:#bfb;" 
| 49 || May 31 || Padres || 3–2  || VerHagen (2–0) || Rogers (0–2) || — || 33,418 || 28–21 || W2
|-

 
|- style="background:#bfb;" 
| 50 || June 1 || Padres || 5–2 || Hudson (4–2) || Darvish (4–3) || Wittgren (1) || 34,268 || 29–21 || W3
|- style="background:#fbb;" 
| 51 || June 2 || @ Cubs || 5–7 || Thompson (6–0) || Liberatore (1–1) || — || 30,466 || 29–22 || L1
|- style="background:#bfb;" 
| 52 || June 3 || @ Cubs || 14–5 || Mikolas (4–3) || Stroman (2–5) || Thompson (1) || 32,482 || 30–22 || W1
|- style="background:#fbb;" 
| 53 || June 4  || @ Cubs || 1–6 || Swarmer (1–0) || Oviedo (0–1) || — || 32,792 || 30–23 || L1
|- style="background:#bfb;"
| 54 || June 4  || @ Cubs || 7–4  || Gallegos (1–2) || Rucker (0–1) || — || 31,673 || 31–23 || W1
|- style="background:#bfb;" 
| 55 || June 5 || @ Cubs || 5–3  || Cabrera (3–1) || Norris (0–4) || — || 31,424 || 32–23 || W2
|- style="background:#fbb;" 
| 56 || June 7 || @ Rays || 2–4  || Poche (2–0) || VerHagen (3–1) || — || 10,905 || 32–24 || L1
|- style="background:#fbb;"
| 57 || June 8 || @ Rays || 3–11 || Kluber (3–2) || Naughton (0–2) || — || 12,906 || 32–25 || L2
|- style="background:#fbb;"
| 58 || June 9 || @ Rays || 1–2 || McClanahan (7–2) || Mikolas (4–4) || Adam (2) || 14,892 || 32–26 || L3
|- style="background:#bfb;"
| 59 || June 10 || Reds || 2–0 || Pallante (2–0) || Castillo (2–4) || Helsley (4) || 45,009 || 33–26 || W1
|- style="background:#bfb;"
| 60 || June 11 || Reds || 5–4 || Wittgren (1–0) || Kuhnel (0–1) || — || 43,832 || 34–26 || W2
|- style="background:#fbb;"
| 61 || June 12 || Reds || 6–7 || Hoffman (1–0) || Hudson (4–3) || Díaz (2) || 43,083 || 34–27 || L1
|- style="background:#bfb;"
| 62 || June 13 || Pirates || 7–5 || Gallegos (2–2) || Stratton (3–3) || Helsley (5) || 37,398 || 35–27 || W1
|- style="background:#bfb;"
| 63 || June 14  || Pirates || 3–1 || Liberatore (2–1) || Brubaker (0–7) || Gallegos (9) || 31,193 || 36–27 || W2
|- style="background:#bfb;"
| 64 || June 14  || Pirates || 9–1 || Mikolas (5–4) || Wilson (0–4) || — || 33,977 || 37–27 || W3
|- style="background:#fbb;" 
| 65 || June 15 || Pirates || 4–6 || Crowe (3–3) || Pallante (2–1) || Bednar (11) || 38,658 || 37–28 || L1
|- style="background:#fbb;" 
| 66 || June 17 || @ Red Sox || 5–6 || Wacha (5–1) || Wainwright (5–5) || Houck (3) || 35,251 || 37–29 || L2
|- style="background:#bfb;" 
| 67 || June 18 || @ Red Sox || 11–2 || Hudson (5–3) || Crawford (1–2) || — || 36,141 || 38–29 || W1
|- style="background:#fbb;" 
| 68 || June 19 || @ Red Sox || 4–6 || Pivetta (7–5) || Pallante (2–2) || Houck (4) || 35,989 || 38–30 || L1
|- style="background:#fbb;" 
| 69 || June 20 || @ Brewers || 0–2 || Burnes (5–4) || Mikolas (5–5) || Hader (20) || 28,100 || 38–31 || L2
|- style="background:#bfb;" 
| 70 || June 21 || @ Brewers || 6–2 || Thompson (1–0) || Gonzalez (0–1) || — || 30,208 || 39–31 || W1
|- style="background:#bfb;" 
| 71 || June 22 || @ Brewers || 5–4 || Oviedo (1–1) || Lauer (6–3) || Cabrera (1) || 27,986 || 40–31 || W2
|- style="background:#fbb;" 
| 72 || June 23 || @ Brewers || 4–6 || Alexander (2–0) || Hudson (5–4) || Hader (21) || 32,550 || 40–32 || L1
|- style="background:#fbb;" 
| 73 || June 24 || Cubs || 0–3 || Hendricks (3–6) || Pallante (2–3) || Robertson (9) || 46,524 || 40–33 || L2
|- style="background:#bfb;" 
| 74 || June 25 || Cubs || 5–3 || Helsley (3–0) || Leiter Jr. (1–2) || — || 45,159 || 41–33 || W1
|- style="background:#fbb;" 
| 75 || June 26 || Cubs || 5–6  || Robertson (2–0) || Thompson (1–1) || — || 44,824 || 41–34 || L1
|- style="background:#bfb;" 
| 76 || June 27 || Marlins || 9–0 || Wainwright (6–5) || López (5–4) || — || 34,701 || 42–34 || W1
|- style="background:#bfb;" 
| 77 || June 28 || Marlins || 5–3 || Hudson (6–4) || Garrett (1–3) || Helsley (6) || 32,065 || 43–34 || W2
|- style="background:#fbb;"
| 78 || June 29 || Marlins || 3–4 || Alcántara (8–3) || Helsley (3–1) || — || 35,674 || 43–35 || L1
|-

 
|- style="background:#fbb;" 
| 79 || July 1 || @ Phillies || 3–5 || Alvarado (2–1) || Mikolas (5–6) || Hand (3) || 36,077 || 43–36 || L2
|- style="background:#bfb;" 
| 80 || July 2 || @ Phillies || 7–6 || Helsley (4–1) || Domínguez (4–2) || — || 27,657 || 44–36 || W1
|- style="background:#fbb;" 
| 81 || July 3 || @ Phillies || 0–4 || Wheeler (7–4) || Wainwright (6–6) || — || 44,225 || 44–37 || L1
|- style="background:#fbb;" 
| 82 || July 4 || @ Braves || 3–6 || O'Day (2–2) || Hudson (6–5) || Smith (5) || 41,975 || 44–38 || L2
|- style="background:#fbb;" 
| 83 || July 5 || @ Braves || 1–7 || Anderson (7–5) || Pallante (2–4) || — || 35,656 || 44–39 || L3
|- style="background:#fbb;"
| 84 || July 6 || @ Braves || 0–3 || Fried (9–2) || Mikolas (5–7) || Minter (2) || 36,718 || 44–40 || L4
|- style="background:#bfb;" 
| 85 || July 7 || @ Braves || 3–2  || Helsley (5–1) || Matzek (0–2) || Naughton (1) || 37,756 || 45–40 || W1
|- style="background:#fbb;"
| 86 || July 8 || Phillies || 0–2 || Wheeler (8–4) || Wainwright (6–7) || Hand (4) || 41,100 || 45–41 || L1
|- style="background:#fbb;"
| 87 || July 9 || Phillies || 0–1 || Alvarado (3–1) || Gallegos (2–3) || Knebel (12) || 41,853 || 45–42 || L2
|- style="background:#bfb;" 
| 88 || July 10 || Phillies || 4–3 || Hicks (2–4) || Domínguez (4–3) || Helsley (7) || 36,112 || 46–42 || W1
|- style="background:#bfb;" 
| 89 || July 11 || Phillies || 6–1 || Mikolas (6–7) || Nola (5–7) || — || 34,399 || 47–42 || W2
|- style="background:#bfb;"
| 90 || July 12 || Dodgers || 7–6 || Oviedo (2–1) || White (1–2) || Gallegos (10) || 37,150 || 48–42 || W3
|- style="background:#fbb;"
| 91 || July 13 || Dodgers || 6–7 || Kimbrel (3–4) || Gallegos (2–4) || Phillips (1) || 39,292 || 48–43 || L1
|- style="background:#fbb;"
| 92 || July 14 || Dodgers || 0–4 || Anderson (10–1) || Hudson (6–6) || — || 40,062 || 48–44 || L2
|- style="background:#bfb;"
| 93 || July 15 || Reds || 7–3 || Pallante (3–4) || Greene (3–11) || Helsley (8) || 41,221 || 49–44 || W1
|- style="background:#bfb;"
| 94 || July 16 || Reds || 11–3 || Mikolas (7–7) || Lodolo (2–3) || — || 41,014 || 50–44 || W2
|- style=background:#bbbfff 
|colspan=11|92nd All-Star Game in Los Angeles, California
|- style="background:#fbb;" 
| 95 || July 22 || @ Reds || 5–9 || Sanmartin (4–4) || Wainwright (6–8) || — || 25,547 || 50–45 || L1
|- style="background:#bfb;"
| 96 || July 23 || @ Reds || 6–3 || Matz (4–3) || Minor (1–7) || Helsley (9) || 27,190 || 51–45 || W1
|- style="background:#fbb;" 
| 97 || July 24 || @ Reds || 3–6 || Mahle (4–7) || Mikolas (7–8) || Strickland (5) || 18,813 || 51–46 || L1
|- style="background:#fbb;"
| 98 || July 26 || @ Blue Jays || 3–10 || Mayza (5–0) || Hicks (2–5) || — || 39,756 || 51–47 || L2
|- style="background:#bfb;"
| 99 || July 27 || @ Blue Jays || 6–1 || Wainwright (7–8) || Gausman (7–8) || — || 36,666 || 52–47 || W1
|- style="background:#bfb;"
| 100 || July 29 || @ Nationals || 6–2 || Mikolas (8–8) || Sánchez (0–3) || — || 30,170 || 53–47 || W2
|- style="background:#fbb;"
| 101 || July 30 || @ Nationals || 6–7 || Ramírez (3–1) || Cabrera (3–2) || Finnegan (4) || 34,440 || 53–48 || L1
|- style="background:#bfb;" 
| 102 || July 31 || @ Nationals || 5–0 || Pallante (4–4) || Gray (7–7) || — || 28,738 || 54–48 || W1
|-

 
|- style="background:#bfb;" 
| 103 || August 2 || Cubs || 6–0 || Wainwright (8–8) || Thompson (8–5) || — || 44,344 || 55–48 || W2
|- style="background:#bfb;" 
| 104 || August 4  || Cubs || 4–3 || Helsley (6–1) || Uelmen (0–1) || — || 41,734 || 56–48 || W3
|- style="background:#bfb;" 
| 105 || August 4  || Cubs || 7–2 || Hicks (3–5) || Castro (0–1) || — || 44,669 || 57–48 || W4
|- style="background:#bfb;" 
| 106 || August 5 || Yankees || 4–3 || Pallante (5–4) || Holmes (5–3) || Helsley (10) || 46,940 || 58–48 || W5
|- style="background:#bfb;"
| 107 || August 6 || Yankees || 1–0 || Montgomery (4–3) || Germán (1–2) || Gallegos (11) || 48,581 || 59–48 || W6
|- style="background:#bfb;" 
| 108 || August 7 || Yankees || 12–9 || Stratton (6–4) || Abreu (2–1) || Helsley (11) || 46,472 || 60–48 || W7
|- style="background:#fbb;" 
| 109 || August 9 || @ Rockies || 5–16 || Feltner (2–3) || Mikolas (8–9) || — || 35,011 || 60–49 || L1
|- style="background:#bfb;"
| 110 || August 10 || @ Rockies || 9–5 || Quintana (4–5) || Freeland (7–8) || — || 35,164 || 61–49 || W1
|- style="background:#fbb;"
| 111 || August 11 || @ Rockies || 6–8 || Gilbreath (1–0) || Hicks (3–6) || Bard (24) || 30,293 || 61–50 || L1
|- style="background:#bfb;"
| 112 || August 12 || Brewers || 3–1 || Montgomery (5–3) || Lauer (8–4) || Helsley (12) || 45,669 || 62–50 || W1
|- style="background:#fbb;"
| 113 || August 13 || Brewers || 2–3  || Williams (4–2) || Gallegos (2–5) || Bush (3) || 45,905 || 62–51 || L1
|- style="background:#bfb;"
| 114 || August 14 || Brewers || 6–3 || Mikolas (9–9) || Rogers (1–6) || — || 44,142 || 63–51 || W1
|- style="background:#bfb;"
| 115 || August 16 || Rockies || 5–4 || Helsley (7–1) || Lamet (1–2) || — || 39,105 || 64–51 || W2
|- style="background:#bfb;" 
| 116 || August 17 || Rockies || 5–1 || Montgomery (6–3) || Márquez (6–10) || — || 38,033 || 65–51 || W3
|- style="background:#bfb;"
| 117 || August 18 || Rockies || 13–0 || Wainwright (9–8) || Senzatela (3–7) || — || 36,137 || 66–51 || W4
|- style="background:#bfb;"
| 118 || August 19 || @ Diamondbacks || 5–1 || Mikolas (10–9) || Henry (2–2) || — || 32,183 || 67–51 || W5
|- style="background:#bfb;"
| 119 || August 20 || @ Diamondbacks || 16–7 || Cabrera (4–2) || Bumgarner (6–13) || — || 34,248 || 68–51 || W6
|- style="background:#bfb;"
| 120 || August 21 || @ Diamondbacks || 6–4 || Woodford (2–0) || Mantiply (1–4) || Gallegos (12) || 25,064 || 69–51 || W7
|- style="background:#bfb;"
| 121 || August 22 || @ Cubs || 1–0 || Montgomery (7–3) || Smyly (5–7) || — || 29,719 || 70–51 || W8
|- style="background:#fbb;" 
| 122 || August 23  || @ Cubs || 0–2 || Rucker (3–1) || Wainwright (9–9) || Hughes (3) || 27,273 || 70–52 || L1
|- style="background:#bfb;"
| 123 || August 23  || @ Cubs || 13–3 || Woodford (3–0) || Sampson (1–4) || — || 28,163 || 71–52 || W1
|- style="background:#fbb;"
| 124 || August 24 || @ Cubs || 1–7 || Wick (4–6) || Mikolas (10–10) || — || 32,012 || 71–53 || L1
|- style="background:#bfb;"
| 125 || August 25 || @ Cubs || 8–3 || Hudson (7–6) || Stroman (3–6) || — || 28,803 || 72–53 || W1
|- style="background:#fbb;"
| 126 || August 26 || Braves || 4–11 || Strider (8–4) || Quintana (4–6) || — || 46,027 || 72–54 || L1
|- style="background:#bfb;"
| 127 || August 27 || Braves || 6–5 || Helsley (8–1) || Jansen (5–1) || — || 46,119 || 73–54 || W1
|- style="background:#bfb;"
| 128 || August 28 || Braves || 6–3 || Helsley (9–1) || Minter (5–4) || Gallegos (13) || 42,897 || 74–54 || W2
|- style="background:#bfb;"
| 129 || August 29 || @ Reds || 13–4 || Stratton (7–4) || Anderson (0–1) || — || 11,051 || 75–54 || W3
|- style="background:#fbb;"
| 130 || August 30 || @ Reds || 1–5 || Law (1–1) || Hudson (7–7) || — || 13,271 || 75–55 || L1
|- style="background:#bfb;"
| 131 || August 31 || @ Reds || 5–3  || Pallante (6–4) || Anderson (0–2) || — || 13,613 || 76–55 || W1
|-

 
|- style="background:#bfb;" 
| 132 || September 2 || Cubs || 8–0 || Montgomery (8–3) || Sampson (1–5) || — || 44,491 || 77–55 || W2
|- style="background:#bfb;" 
| 133 || September 3 || Cubs || 8–4 || Wainwright (10–9) || Smyly (5–8) || — || 47,816 || 78–55 || W3
|- style="background:#bfb;" 
| 134 || September 4 || Cubs || 2–0 || Mikolas (11–10) || Hughes (2–2) || Helsley (13) || 46,642 || 79–55 || W4
|- style="background:#fbb;" 
| 135 || September 5 || Nationals || 0–6 || Sánchez (2–5) || Flaherty (0–1) || Thompson (1) || 45,779 || 79–56 || L1
|- style="background:#bfb;" 
| 136 || September 6 || Nationals || 4–1 || Quintana (5–6) || Espino (0–7) || Helsley (14) || 37,629 || 80–56 || W1
|- style="background:#bfb;"
| 137 || September 7 || Nationals || 6–5 || Woodford (4–0) || Finnegan (5–3) || — || 34,715 || 81–56 || W2
|- style="background:#fbb;"
| 138 || September 8 || Nationals || 6–11 || Thompson (1–0) || Pallante (6–5) || — || 40,437 || 81–57 || L1
|- style="background:#fbb;"
| 139 || September 9 || @ Pirates || 2–8 || Contreras (5–4) || Mikolas (11–11) || — || 15,718 || 81–58 || L2
|- style="background:#bfb;"
| 140 || September 10 || @ Pirates || 7–5 || Gallegos (3–5) || Crowe (5–9) || Helsley (15) || 22,042 || 82–58 || W1
|- style="background:#bfb;" 
| 141 || September 11 || @ Pirates || 4–3 || Stratton (8–4) || De Jong (4–2) || Helsley (16) || 10,398 || 83–58 || W2
|- style="background:#fbb;"
| 142 || September 13 || Brewers || 4–8 || Perdomo (2–0) || Montgomery (8–4) || — || 42,047 || 83–59 || L1
|- style="background:#bfb;" 
| 143 || September 14 || Brewers || 4–1 || Wainwright (11–9) || Burnes (10–7) || Helsley (17) || 46,459 || 84–59 || W1
|- style="background:#fbb;" 
| 144 || September 15 || Reds || 2–3 || Anderson (1–3) || Mikolas (11–12) || Díaz (7) || 44,901 || 84–60 || L1
|- style="background:#bfb;" 
| 145 || September 16 || Reds || 6–5 || Stratton (9–4) || Gibaut (1–2) || Helsley (18) || 47,118 || 85–60 || W1
|- style="background:#bfb;" 
| 146 || September 17  || Reds || 5–1 || Hudson (8−7) || Minor (4−12) || — || 46,678 || 86–60 || W2
|- style="background:#bfb;" 
| 147 || September 17  || Reds || 1–0  || Matz (5–3) || Cruz (0–1) || — || 48,299 || 87–60 || W3
|- style="background:#fbb;" 
| 148 || September 18 || Reds || 0–3 || Cessa (4–3) || Montgomery (8–5) || Farmer (2) || 47,909 || 87–61 || L1
|- style="background:#fbb;" 
| 149 || September 20 || @ Padres || 0–5 || Clevinger (6–7) || Wainwright (11–10) || — || 39,538 || 87–62 || L2
|- style="background:#fbb;" 
| 150 || September 21 || @ Padres || 0–1 || Snell (8–9) || Mikolas (11–13) || Hader (34) || 38,643 || 87–63 || L3
|- style="background:#bfb;" 
| 151 || September 22 || @ Padres || 5–4 || Flaherty (1–1) || Martinez (4–4) || Gallegos (14) || 33,389 || 88–63 || W1
|- style="background:#bfb;" 
| 152 || September 23 || @ Dodgers || 11–0 || Quintana (6–6) || Heaney (3–3) || — || 50,041 || 89–63 || W2
|- style="background:#fbb;"
| 153 || September 24 || @ Dodgers || 2–6 || Kershaw (10–3) || Montgomery (8–6) || — || 52,527 || 89–64 || L1
|- style="background:#fbb;"
| 154 || September 25 || @ Dodgers || 1–4 || Grove (1–0) || Wainwright (11–11) || Jackson (1) || 48,695 || 89–65 || L2
|- style="background:#bfb;" 
| 155 || September 27 || @ Brewers || 6–2 || Mikolas (12–13) || Houser (6–10) || — || 29,341 || 90–65 || W1
|- style="background:#fbb;" 
| 156 || September 28 || @ Brewers || 1–5 || Woodruff (13–4) || Quintana (6–7) || — || 28,835 || 90–66 || L1
|- style="background:#bfb;" 
| 157 || September 30 || Pirates || 2–1 || Flaherty (2–1) || Oviedo (4–3) || Helsley (19) || 47,032 || 91–66 || W1
|-

 
|- style="background:#bfb;" 
| 158 || October 1 || Pirates || 13–3 || Montgomery (9–6) || Ortiz (0–2) || — || 46,365 || 92–66 || W2
|- style="background:#fbb;" 
| 159 || October 2 || Pirates || 5–7 || De Jong (6–2) || Wainwright (11–12) || Bednar (19) || 46,680 || 92–67 || L1
|- style="background:#fbb;" 
| 160 || October 3 || @ Pirates || 2–3 || Ramírez (4–1) || Gallegos (3–6) || — || 12,702 || 92–68 || L2
|- style="background:#bfb;" 
| 161 || October 4 || @ Pirates || 8–7  || Stratton (10–4) || De Jong (6–3) || — || 12,842 || 93–68 || W1
|- style="background:#fbb;"
| 162 || October 5 || @ Pirates || 3–5 || Bañuelos (2–1) || Liberatore (2–2) || Ramírez (1) || 15,319 || 93–69 || L1
|-

|- style="text-align:center;"
| Legend:       = Win       = Loss      Bold = Cardinals team member

Roster

Postseason

Postseason Game log

|- style=background:#fbb;"
| 1 || October 7 || Phillies || 3–6 || Robertson (1–0) || Helsley (0–1) || — || 45,911 || 0–1
|- style=background:#fbb;"
| 2 || October 8 || Phillies || 0–2 || Nola (1–0) || Mikolas (0–1) || Eflin (1) || 48,515 || 0–2
|-

Postseason rosters

| style="text-align:left" |
Pitchers: 12 Jordan Hicks 22 Jack Flaherty 32 Steven Matz 39 Miles Mikolas 48 Jordan Montgomery 50 Adam Wainwright 53 Andre Pallante 56 Ryan Helsley 57 Zack Thompson 62 José Quintana 65 Giovanny Gallegos 70 Packy Naughton 
Catchers: 4 Yadier Molina 7 Andrew Knizner 
Infielders: 11 Paul DeJong 16 Nolan Gorman 19 Tommy Edman 28 Nolan Arenado 33 Brendan Donovan 46 Paul Goldschmidt
Outfielders: 3 Dylan Carlson 21 Lars Nootbaar 25 Corey Dickerson 26 Ben DeLuzio 36 Juan Yepez 
Designated hitters: 5 Albert Pujols 
|- valign="top"

Statistics

Batting 
(through October 5, 2022)
Players in bold are on the active roster.
Note: G = Games played; AB = At bats; R = Runs; H = Hits; 2B = Doubles; 3B = Triples; HR = Home runs; RBI = Runs batted in; SB = Stolen bases; BB = Bases on balls; SO = Strikeouts; BA = Batting average; OBP = On-base percentage; SLG = Slugging percentage; OPS = On-base percentage plus slugging; TB = Total bases

Source

Pitching 
(through October 5, 2022)
Players in bold are on the active roster.
Note: W = Wins; L = Losses; ERA = Earned run average; WHIP = Walks plus hits per inning pitched; G = Games pitched; GS = Games started; SV = Saves; IP = Innings pitched; H = Hits allowed; R = Runs allowed; ER = Earned runs allowed; BB = Bases on balls allowed; SO = Strikeouts

Source

Awards and achievements

Awards
 National League (NL) Player of the Month:
 Nolan Arenado (2), April, August
 Paul Goldschmidt, May
 NL Player of the Week:
 Nolan Arenado (2), April 7–10, August 1–7
 Paul Goldschmidt (3), June 13–19, July 21–24, August 15–21
 Albert Pujols (2), August 15–21, September 19–25

Milestones
 Games played: 3,000 – Albert Pujols – June 4
 At bats: 5,000 – Nolan Arenado – July 2

Minor league system and first-year player draft

Teams

Major League Baseball draft

The 2022 Major League Baseball (MLB) First-Year Player Draft began on Sunday, July 17, and ended on Tuesday, July 19. The draft assigned amateur baseball players to MLB teams.

2022 Draft Order

2022 Draft Tracker (STL Cardinals)

References

External links
St. Louis Cardinals 2022 schedule at MLB.com
2022 St. Louis Cardinals schedule at ESPN
2022 St. Louis Cardinals season at Baseball Reference

St. Louis Cardinals seasons
St. Louis Cardinals
St. Louis Cardinals
National League Central champion seasons